Don Fort (born 1968) is an American law enforcement officer who served as the 24th Chief of Internal Revenue Service, Criminal Investigation (IRS-CI) from June 1, 2017 to September 30, 2020. As Chief, Fort oversaw a worldwide staff of approximately 3,300 CI employees, including approximately 2,200 special agents who investigate and assist in the prosecution of criminal tax, money laundering, public corruption, cyber, ID theft, narcotics, terrorist-financing and Bank Secrecy Act related crime cases.

Early life and education
A native of Pittsburgh, Fort graduated with a bachelor's degree in accounting from Gettysburg College in 1990 and is a Certified Public Accountant licensed by the State of Virginia since 1994.

Career

Fort began his career with the Internal Revenue Service (IRS) in 1991 as a Special Agent with Criminal Investigation (CI) in the Baltimore District. He eventually moved on to positions as Supervisory Special Agent in Orlando, Florida; Senior Analyst and Acting Director, Office of Special Investigative Techniques at the CI Headquarters in Washington, D.C.; Assistant Special Agent in Charge at the Baltimore and Washington D.C. Field Offices; Special Agent in Charge of the Philadelphia Field Office; and Deputy Director of Strategy at the CI Headquarters. Fort entered the Senior Executive Service in January 2011 when he was appointed to serve as a Director of Field Operations, the position he held until his appointment as Deputy Chief in August 2014. As Deputy Chief of CI, he supported Chief Richard Weber in managing the day-to-day activities of the organization and also advised the IRS Deputy Commissioner and IRS Commissioner on Criminal Investigation matters. Fort was appointed as the new Chief of IRS-CI in June 2017 after former Chief Richard Weber announced his departure.

When introduced as the new Chief of IRS-CI, Fort announced areas in which CI would focus under his leadership: fulfill the agency's primary criminal tax enforcement mission, establish a new data-driven national effort to identify areas of non-compliance and fighting international tax crimes.

Fort was the Chief during the agency's 100th anniversary in 2019 and held multiple events to celebrate and highlight the agency's success since its inception. One of these events was the panel discussion The IRS and Organized Crime: 100 Years of Following the Money held at the Mob Museum in Las Vegas, in which Chief Fort and some of his agents described recent cases and how they uncover financial crimes across the globe. Chief Fort is a regular speaker on financial crimes and investigations in conferences hosted by organizations such as the Association of Certified Fraud Examiners, the Association of Certified Anti-Money Laundering Specialists and the Association of Certified Financial Crime Specialists, to name a few.

On July 9, 2020, Fort announced his retirement as IRS-CI Chief effective September 30, 2020 having served in the position since June 2017. On 29 October 2020, Fort joined the law firm Kostelanetz & Fink, LLP as Director of Investigations.

References

External links
Criminal Investigation (CI) At-a-Glance

Living people
1968 births
American police officers
Gettysburg College alumni
People from Pittsburgh
Trump administration personnel
Criminal Investigation